RNAS St Merryn (HMS Vulture) is a former Royal Naval Air Station of the Royal Navy's Fleet Air Arm.

History
RNAS St Merryn was constructed during World War 2 with the stone for the runway being quarried from nearby Stepper Point and brought by sea.

There were air raids on St Merryn Airfield and the nearby RAF St Eval on 9 October 1940 resulting in some damage at both locations. Two days later on 11 October there was another air raid on St Merryn. There were no casualties but some damage was caused on the airfield and to nearby houses.

Units
The following units were here at some point:

Current use
The site is now used for farming and a small amount of aircraft flying.

See also

 List of air stations of the Royal Navy

References

St Merr